Compsopyris pereurae is a species of beetle in the family Cerambycidae, the only species in the genus Compsopyris.

References

Compsocerini